St Ignatius Church, Thiruvananthapuram is a Catholic church located in the Kadinamkulam panchayat of Trivandrum, Kerala, India. The church is the center of all religious and social activities. The present church was built in 1989. The foundation stone was blessed by Pope John Paul II during his visit to Trivandrum in 1986. The church is the replica of St.Joseph's Cathedral in Trivandrum City. A grotto of Mary is also built in front of the church and the statue of Mary in the grotto was brought from Lourde by a native of Puthenthope. A parochial house, which shows the typical architecture of Kerala is also situated nearby the church. St.Ignatius Parish community hall is another building situated along with the church in the junction of Puthenthope.

Liturgical Services

See also
 List of Jesuit sites

References

External links

1989 establishments in Kerala
Roman Catholic churches completed in 1989
Roman Catholic churches in Thiruvananthapuram
20th-century Roman Catholic church buildings in India